Spring Fair is organised by ITE Group. Spring Fair is a retail trade exhibition held each February at the National Exhibition Centre (NEC), near Birmingham, UK. Spring Fair began in 1950 but was first held at the NEC in 1976 and was opened by Queen Elizabeth II. 2008 visitor figures exceeded 70,000 (ABC Certified). It occupies all 20 halls of the NEC and is the largest home and gift fair in the UK. ITE Group also organises Autumn Fair for home and gift buyers in September.

External links
Spring Fair official website
Autumn Fair official site
ITE Group official site

Trade fairs in the United Kingdom